The Martin Anderson House is a historic adobe brick house located at 105 North 300 West in Brigham City, Utah. It was listed on the National Register of Historic Places on January 23, 2003.

Description and history 
It is a -story cross-wing house built around 1886 and was expanded to its current size in 1901, making it one of few pioneer-era houses in its area that has not been "remodeled unsympathetically". It includes Greek Revival and Late Victorian architectural elements. It was deemed historically important "for its association with the pioneering phase of the [Brigham City] community and the fruit industry" and is one of eight or fewer classical-style houses in Brigham surviving from the pioneering/settlement period.

References 

Houses on the National Register of Historic Places in Utah
Greek Revival houses in Utah
Victorian architecture in Utah
Houses completed in 1886
Houses in Box Elder County, Utah
National Register of Historic Places in Box Elder County, Utah
Buildings and structures in Brigham City, Utah